"El Tapado" (Santo Domingo, 1627 - Mexico City, July 12, 1684), what he claimed to be Antonio Benavides, marquis of San Vicente, was a mysterious person who arrived in New Spain in 1683, claiming to be visitor general and governor of the colony, and governor of the castle of Acapulco, appointed by the Court in Spain.

Biography
El Tapado disembarked at Veracruz on May 22, 1683, about the same time that the pirate Lorencillo and his men occupied and looted the port. It is possible that he was a confidential messenger or inspector from Queen Regent Mariana of Austria, but he was unable to establish his credentials.

He was arrested at Cuetlaxcoapa (Puebla), accused of being in league with the pirates. From there he was conducted to Mexico City in fetters. In Mexico City, in a place called Xico, he was taken to the scaffold (July 12, 1684). At the time of his execution, an eclipse of the sun was seen. Nevertheless, the authorities continued with the hanging.

Afterwards, the head of El Tapado was taken to Puebla and displayed in front of the door of the la Compañía Church. The reason for this is not known.

References
 "Benavides, Antonio," Enciclopedia de México, v. 2. Mexico City, 1988.
 Orozco Linares, Fernando, Gobernantes de México. Mexico City: Panorama Editorial, 1985, .

1684 deaths
Colonial Mexico
Members of the Royal Spanish Academy
Year of birth unknown
Unidentified people